Isophrictis occidentalis is a moth of the family Gelechiidae. It was described by Annette Frances Braun in 1925. It is found in North America, where it has been recorded from Utah.

References

Moths described in 1925
Isophrictis